Robert Donaldson Ormond (12 January 1931 – 15 November 2017) was a Scottish-born footballer who represented New Zealand at international level.

Ormond played for Falkirk, Airdrieonians and Dumbarton in his native Scotland, before emigrating to New Zealand in 1961. Ormond made his full All Whites debut in a 4–1 win over New Caledonia on 2 June 1962 and played his second and final official FIFA A-international two days later, also against New Caledonia, scoring in the 4–2 win.

Ormond came from a successful footballing family. His brother Willie Ormond represented Scotland at the 1954 FIFA World Cup as a player and the 1974 FIFA World Cup as manager, and his brother Gibby Ormond also played professional football. Ormond's sons Ian Ormond and Duncan Ormond, and granddaughter (Duncan's daughter) Vicki Ormond also represented New Zealand.

In November 2016, Ormond was awarded the Friends of Football Medal of Excellence in recognition of his playing, coaching and media work in New Zealand football.

Ormond died on 15 November 2017, aged 86.

References

1931 births
2017 deaths
New Zealand association footballers
New Zealand international footballers
Association football inside forwards
Falkirk F.C. players
Airdrieonians F.C. (1878) players
Dumbarton F.C. players
Scottish Football League players
Scottish Junior Football Association players
Scottish footballers
Scottish emigrants to New Zealand
Scottish expatriate footballers
Footballers from Falkirk